In game theory a strong Nash equilibrium is a Nash equilibrium in which no coalition, taking the actions of its complements as given, can cooperatively deviate in a way that benefits all of its members. While the Nash concept of stability defines equilibrium only in terms of unilateral deviations, strong Nash equilibrium allows for deviations by every conceivable coalition. This equilibrium concept is particularly useful in areas such as the study of voting systems, in which there are typically many more players than possible outcomes, and so plain Nash equilibria are far too abundant.

The strong Nash concept is criticized as too "strong" in that the environment allows for unlimited private communication. In fact, strong Nash equilibrium has to be Pareto-efficient.  As a result of these requirements,  Strong Nash rarely exists in games interesting enough to deserve study. Nevertheless, it is possible for there to be multiple strong Nash equilibria. For instance, in Approval voting, there is always a strong Nash equilibrium for any Condorcet winner that exists, but this is only unique (apart from inconsequential changes) when there is a majority Condorcet winner.

A relatively weaker yet refined Nash stability concept is called coalition-proof Nash equilibrium (CPNE)  in which the equilibria are immune to multilateral deviations that are self-enforcing. Every correlated strategy supported by iterated strict dominance and on the Pareto frontier is a CPNE.  Further, it is possible for a game to have a Nash equilibrium that is resilient against coalitions less than a specified size k. CPNE is related to the theory of the core.

Confusingly, the concept of a strong Nash equilibrium is unrelated to that of a weak Nash equilibrium. That is, a Nash equilibrium can be both strong and weak, either, or neither.

References

Game theory equilibrium concepts